Penola Island is a small island in Sherratt Bay lying close off the south coast of King George Island, in the South Shetland Islands. Charted in 1937 by DI personnel on the Discovery II, and named for the Penola, the British Graham Land Expedition (BGLE) ship which assisted the Discovery II in the search for a survey party stranded on King George Island in January 1937.

See also 
 List of antarctic and sub-antarctic islands

Islands of King George Island (South Shetland Islands)